Robert or Bob Marx may refer to:

 Robert F. Marx (1933–2019), underwater archaeologist, treasure hunter, and author
 Robert Marx (fencer) (born 1956), American Olympic fencer

See also
 Robert Marks (disambiguation)
 Marx (surname)